Bruno Orsoni (born 21 October 1973) is a French former freestyle swimmer who competed in the 1996 Summer Olympics.

References

1973 births
Living people
French male freestyle swimmers
Olympic swimmers of France
Swimmers at the 1996 Summer Olympics